Charles Aubrey Eaton (March 29, 1868January 23, 1953) was a Canadian-born American clergyman and politician who led congregations at Natick, Massachusetts, 1893–1895; Bloor Street, Toronto, 1895–1901; Euclid Avenue, Cleveland, Ohio, 1901–1909; and Madison Avenue, New York City, 1909 to 1916. He participated in the creation of the United Nations.

Biography
Eaton was clergyman, journalist, U.S. congressman and a signatory to original United Nations Charter. He was born on a farm near Pugwash, Nova Scotia. A son of Stephen Eaton, a shipbuilder and farmer, and Mary Desiah (Parker) Eaton, he attended school locally and worked on his father's farm. From 1884 to 1886, he attended school in Amherst, Nova Scotia, where he was baptized and chose to become a Baptist minister. In 1890, he received a B.A. from Acadia University, Wolfville, Nova Scotia. Three years later he graduated with the B.D. from Newton Theological Institution, Newton Centre, Massachusetts, and was ordained a Baptist minister. In 1893, he served as a pastor at the First Baptist Church of Natick, Massachusetts. At Natick, he met Mary Winifred Parlin (May 11, 1874November 12, 1948), daughter of local merchant and Civil War veteran William D. Parlin and Mary Brown. They were married June 26, 1895, and had six children. Also in 1895, he became a citizen of the United States and was named pastor at a Bloor Street church in Toronto. He received the M.A. from McMaster University in Toronto in 1896, was awarded a D.D. by Baylor University in 1899 and Acadia University in 1907, and an LL.D. from McMaster University in 1916.

In 1924, Eaton was elected as a Republican from New Jersey to the 69th U.S. Congress and to the thirteen succeeding Congresses, serving until 1952. He was a steadfast opponent of President Franklin D. Roosevelt's New Deal. However, his ability to work well with both Republicans and Democrats would prompt presidents Franklin D. Roosevelt and Harry S. Truman to frequently invite "Doc" Eaton, as he was sometimes known, to the White House as an informal advisor.

On June 26, 1945, appointed by President Roosevelt, Eaton was one of the signers of the original United Nations Charter, the international organization's foundational treaty, in San Francisco, California. In 1947 he became chairman of the United States House Committee on Foreign Affairs and of the Herter Committee.  With a Democratic president (Harry S. Truman) and a Republican Congress, and with the influence of economic aid in foreign policy, the chairmanship was a powerful post. Eaton's leadership was at times strongly challenged by the neo-isolationist group in the House, but he achieved the passage of every piece of legislation that he sponsored, including continuation of United Nations Relief and Rehabilitation Administration (UNRRA), a program of aid to Greece and Turkey (the Truman Doctrine), and the Marshall Plan. The opposition to these programs centered in the House and Eaton was their chief defender. The passage of the Marshall Plan was a high point in Eaton's political career. President Truman gave testimony in his memoirs to Eaton for his bipartisan support of American foreign policy. Twenty days after his retirement from Congress, Eaton died in Washington, D.C., and was interred in Hillside Cemetery in Scotch Plains, New Jersey.

Evangelism

In 1904, Eaton's commitment to evangelism got him arrested on the streets of Cleveland, Ohio, for persistently ignoring by-laws prohibiting street preaching. However, he wanted to extend his ministry beyond the churches, into which many of the spiritually needy never stepped. At the same time, Eaton was the preacher at Euclid Avenue Baptist Church, situated on Cleveland's "millionaire's row", and as a result he came to the attention of John D. Rockefeller, a summer resident of Cleveland who attended church there.  They became lifelong friends, and this connection influenced Eaton's future path. It also influenced that of another well-known Canadian who went on to have an outstanding career in the United States, his nephew, Cyrus S. Eaton. He introduced him to Rockefeller in 1901, when Cyrus was still a university student. Cyrus went on to work for Rockefeller, and eventually become one of Cleveland's first citizens, and one of America's premier industrialists. Charles moved to North Plainfield, New Jersey, in 1909, and started a dairy farm, while at the same time preaching to a prominent New York City Baptist congregation, the Madison Avenue Baptist Church. The area in which he lived separated from North Plainfield in 1926, and the Borough of Watchung, New Jersey, was founded there. He lived there until his death.

Journalism
Eaton was sociological editor of the Toronto Globe (1896–1901), associate editor of Westminster (1899–1901), special correspondent for The Times, New-York Tribune, and Boston Transcript while in Toronto.  He was editor of Leslie's Weekly (1919, 1920), and (while director of labor relations at General Electric's National Lamp Works) editor of Light (1923–1924).

References

External links

Charles A. Eaton Papers at the Seeley G. Mudd Manuscript Library, Princeton University

Political Graveyard info for Charles Aubrey Eaton
The Eaton Family of Nova Scotia, pg. 136, by Arthur Wentworth Hamilton Eaton. Cambridge, Massachusetts: The Murray Printing Company, privately printed,1929

1868 births
1953 deaths
Canadian emigrants to the United States
People of New England Planter descent
Acadia University alumni
Baylor University alumni
McMaster University alumni
People from Cumberland County, Nova Scotia
People from Watchung, New Jersey
People from North Plainfield, New Jersey
Politicians from Cleveland
People from Manhattan
Politicians from Toronto
The Globe and Mail people
American officials of the United Nations
Ohio Republicans
Republican Party members of the United States House of Representatives from New Jersey
American families of English ancestry
Burials at Hillside Cemetery (Scotch Plains, New Jersey)
Baptists from New York (state)